Kansari Halder (1910-1997) was an Indian politician, belonging to the Communist Party of India. He earned fame as a leader of and for his active participation in the Tebhaga movement.

Early life
The son of Narendra Krishna Halder Jashodarani Haldar, he was born at village Andaria on 26 September 1910. He was educated at Ripon College and Bangabasi College in Kolkata. While still a student he was arrested in 1930 for his participation in the Civil Disobedience Movement. He remained with the Congress till 1941, when he joined the Communist Party of India.

Tebhaga movement
Kansari Halder provided leadership to the peasant movement that developed in the 1940s in Kakdwip-Sundarbans area of 24 Parganas and later became well known as the Tebhaga movement. Many people were killed in police-public face-off. Although he was convicted to death sentence in the Chandanpiri case in the Kakdwip area the police could not get him as he had gone underground. In 1957, he was elected to the Lok Sabha while he was still convicted. He was later acquitted.

Electoral performance
He was elected to the Lok Sabha in 1957 from Diamond Harbour, was reelected to the Lok Sabha in 1967 from Mathurapur, and was elected to the West Bengal Legislative Assembly in 1972 from Sonarpur.

Death
Kansari Halder spent the later years of his life in poverty. He died on 29 August 1997.

References

Communist Party of India politicians from West Bengal
1910 births
1997 deaths
Lok Sabha members from West Bengal
West Bengal MLAs 1972–1977
People from South 24 Parganas district
India MPs 1967–1970
India MPs 1957–1962